Pierre E. E. Braine (26 October 1900 – 6 November 1951) was a Belgian international footballer. A midfielder, he played club football for Beerschot VAC between 1919 and 1933. He also represented Belgium at the 1928 Summer Olympics and 1930 FIFA World Cup.

Pierre's brother Raymond was also a Belgian international player.

References

External links
 FIFA profile
  Beerschot profile

1900 births
1951 deaths
Belgian footballers
Belgium international footballers
K. Beerschot V.A.C. players
Olympic footballers of Belgium
Footballers at the 1928 Summer Olympics
1930 FIFA World Cup players
Association football midfielders
Footballers from Antwerp